"My Baby Loves Me (Just the Way That I Am)" is a song written by American singer-songwriter Gretchen Peters. The song was first recorded by Canadian country music singer Patricia Conroy on her 1992 album, Bad Day for Trains. Her version was released in May 1992 as the first single from her album and peaked at number 8 on the RPM Top Country Tracks chart.

Martina McBride version

Martina McBride covered the song in 1993 under the title of "My Baby Loves Me". Her rendition was released in July 1993 as the first single from her 1993 album The Way That I Am and reached number-one on the Canadian RPM Country Tracks chart. The song peaked at number 2 on the Billboard Hot Country Singles & Tracks chart for the week of December 4, 1993.

McBride's version includes slide guitar and six-string bass riffs from Paul Worley, who criticized his own performance on them and said that they "somehow never got erased".

Personnel 

 Joe Chemay – bass guitar
 Dan Dugmore – electric guitar
 Dann Huff – electric guitar
 Mary Ann Kennedy – backing vocals
 Martina McBride – lead and backing vocals
 Steve Nathan – keyboards
 Pam Rose – backing vocals
 Lonnie Wilson – drums
 Paul Worley – electric and acoustic guitars

Music video 
A music video was filmed for this version of the song. It was directed by Steven Goldmann.

Chart performance

Patricia Conroy

Year-end charts

Martina McBride

Year-end charts

References

1992 singles
1993 singles
Patricia Conroy songs
Martina McBride songs
Songs written by Gretchen Peters
Song recordings produced by Paul Worley
Warner Records singles
RCA Records Nashville singles
Music videos directed by Steven Goldmann
1992 songs